Gunpowder is an outback town and locality in the City of Mount Isa, Queensland, Australia.

Geography 
Waggabundi  is a former Aboriginal township in the vicinity of the Mount Oxide Mine.

Waggaboonyah Range is a north-south range in the south of the locality.

Gunpowder has the following mountains:

 Kangaroo Pt
 Mount Gordon 
 Mount Oxide 

Gunpowder has the following mountain passes:

 Bone Gap
 Kennedy Gap
 Sisters Gap
Waggaboonyah Dam is a dam across Greenstone Creek which creates Waggaboonyah Lake. Downstream of the dam the creek enters Gunpowder Creek.

There are mines in the locality but the predominant land use is grazing on native vegetation.

History 

Mount Oxide was discovered by Ernest Henry in 1882. Owing to the remote location, little mining took place until the 1920s.

Mount Oxide Mine is located 140 km north of Mount Isa and 40 km north-east of Mount Gordon Mine (formerly known as Gunpowder).

The main mining periods were 1927 to 1943 and 1955 to 1960, when the higher grade ore was worked by underground methods with access via an adit; and 1967 to 1971, when the lower-grade envelope and remnants of high-grade ore were bulk mined in an open-cut.

Underground mining produced 79,000 tonnes of ore (15.9% Cu) for a yield of 12,500 tonnes of copper, and some 355,000 tonnes of ore averaging 2.5% Cu were treated at the Gunpowder concentration plant in 1970–71. Leaching and precipitation operations in the 1962 to 1965 and 1978 to 1982 periods yielded an additional 1,369 tonnes of copper.

Between World War I and World War II an Aboriginal townsite existed on the site named Waggabundi (after the Waggabonga Aboriginal tribe). The abandoned townsite is about 1 km south of the existing open pit.

Mount Oxide Mine is now classed as an abandoned mine site as there is no current mining lease or environmental authority in place.

Waggaboonyah Dam was built in 1969 for water storage. 

Gunpowder State School opened on 27 January 1970. It closed on 24 September 1982 but reopened on 24 January 1991. It closed permanently on 31 December 1999.

Legal issues were raised in the mid 1990s over the extent and responsibility for rehabilitation liability for the mine site. The operators of the site who caused the mining disturbances no longer exist as corporate entities.

Economy 
There are a number of homesteads in the locality:

 Bar Creek
 Calton Hills
 Chidna
 New Chidna
 Yelvertoft

Mine remediation 
The legacy of a century of mining activity has resulted in residual stockpiles, leach heaps and overburden dumps remaining on the site. Watercourses turn blue-green for several kilometres downstream of the mine pit (downstream of the confluence of the tributaries around the mine area) after moderate to heavy wet seasons. Downstream impacts have been observed to vary depending on the intensity of wet seasons and the time of visit, with impacts ranging from minimal to extensive downstream discolouration.

A government interdepartmental working group has been formed to manage the impact of mine flooding in north-west Queensland. Immediate costs incurred to investigate and address issues have been borne by individual agencies.

The short-term objectives of the Mount Oxide abandoned mine site are to:

 minimise environmental harm at or from the site
 minimise the risk to health and safety of people and animals.

The long-term objective is to remediate the site to allow for an agreed future use of the land.

Education 
There are no schools in the locality. The nearest primary schools are Camooweal State School in neighbouring Camooweal to the west and Barkly Highway State School in Soldiers Hill in Mount Isa to the south-east. The nearest secondary school is Spinifex State College in Mount Isa. However, given the size of the locality of Gunpowder, for many parts of the locality the distances to the schools would be too far and distance education or boarding school would be necessary. Spinifex State College provides boarding facilities.

References

Attribution 
This Wikipedia article contains material from Mount Oxide Mine Remediation Project, published on 31 May 2018 by The State of Queensland under CC-BY-4.0 licence, accessed on 21 December 2020, archived on 21 December 2020.

External links 
 

Towns in Queensland
City of Mount Isa
Localities in Queensland